Ryki may refer to the following places:
Ryki in Lublin Voivodeship (east Poland)
Ryki, Masovian Voivodeship (east-central Poland)
Ryki, Pomeranian Voivodeship (north Poland)